Villoresi is an Italian surname. Notable people with the surname include:

Emilio Villoresi (1914–1939), Italian racing driver
Giulia Villoresi (born 1984), Italian writer
Lorenzo Villoresi (born 1956), Italian perfumer
Luigi Villoresi (1909–1997), Italian racing driver
Pamela Villoresi (born 1957), Italian actress

See also
Canale Villoresi, canal in Italy
Villoresi Park, park in Italy

Italian-language surnames